Baselios Paulose II (born as Puthusseril Joseph Paulose (12 June 1914–1 September 1996) was the second Maphrian(Catholicos) of the East Jacobite Syrian Christian Church (Syriac Orthodox Church in India) (posthumously known as Maphrian of India)

Early life 

Paulose was born on 12 June 1914 to the Vicar of Cherai St Mary's church, Kasheesho Puthusseril Joseph and Eralil Elizabeth of Vadakkan Paravoor. He was named P. J. Paulose and completed his secondary education at Cherai Ramavarma High School. After completing college education at Kottayam CMS College and Alwaye Union Christian College, Paulose joined the Manjinikkara Dayaro. Paulose continued his Syriac education under Rabban Abdul Ahad (later Patriarch Yaqub III).

Holy Orders

Priesthood 

In 1934, Yulius Elias, the delegate of the Patriarch to Malankara, ordained Paulose as deacon. In 1938, Yulius ordained him priest at Manjinikkara Dayaro (Monastery). Later Paulose became secretary to Yulius and malphono at Manjinikkara Dayaro.

Metropolitan 

On 25 April 1952, the Kandanad diocesan delegates meeting selected 'Kasheesho' Paulose to succeed Athanasius Paulose who had  therelinquished his additional duties as the metropolitan of Kandanad due to illness. Patriarch Ignatius Aphrem I Barsoum ordained Paulose P. J. with the name Mor Philoxenus on 19 October 1952 at Homs, Syria.

Catholicos 

On 7 September 1975, Ignatius Jacob III consecrated Philoxenus as Catholicos of the East (Catholicos of India). On 14 September 1980, he consecrated Ignatios Zakka I Iwas, Archbishop of Baghdad, as the Syriac Orthodox Patriarch of Antioch; this was the first time in the long history of the Patriarchate of Antioch that a bishop from Malankara officiated at the consecration of a Patriarch. He also ordained six bishops for the Malankara church.

Death and entombment 
Went to heavenly abode on 1 September 1996. The remains of Catholicos Basileus Paulose II are interred in a tomb in St. George's Monastery, Malekurish near Puthenkurishu in Ernakulam District, Kerala.

See also
List of Syriac Orthodox Patriarchs of Antioch
List of Maphrians
Syriac Christianity
Saint Thomas Christians

External links
 Biography from Margonitho: Syriac Orthodox Resources
 Syrian Church website: Life and legacy of Late Lamented Catholicos Mor Baselios  Paulose II - www.Catholicate.in
 Mar Gregorious Jacobite Syrian Church North Marady

Indian Oriental Orthodox Christians
Malayali people
People from Ernakulam district
Indian Christian religious leaders
Syriac Orthodox Church bishops
1914 births
1996 deaths
Christian clergy from Kochi